Amanibakhi was a Kushite King of Meroe. His reign dates to the 4th century BC.

Amanibakhi was the successor of Akhraten and the predecessor of Nastasen. The burial place of Amanibakhi is not known.

References

4th-century BC monarchs of Kush